Jason Jones-Hughes (born 13 September 1976 in Sydney) is an Australian born rugby union player who played for the Wales national rugby union team. The fact that he represented Wales caused friction between the two national rugby unions as he had played for the Australian Barbarians and was part of the Australian team that toured Argentina in 1997 before representing Wales. The International Rugby Board ruled he was eligible to play for Wales as he had not played a full international match for Australia national rugby union team and he had a Welsh qualification through his parents. In 2000 he was initially implicated in the "grannygate" scandal before being exonerated.

A centre, he played his club rugby for Newport and was part of the 1999 Wales World Cup Squad hosted by Wales. Due to injuries he only attained three caps for Wales. He later joined Munster before his injuries caused him to retire from rugby.

References

External links
 Wales profile

1976 births
Wales international rugby union players
Australian rugby union players
Newport RFC players
Rugby union players from Sydney
Living people
Rugby union centres
Munster Rugby players